Oakland School is a coeducational boarding and day school in Troy, Virginia, specializing in the education of children with dyslexia, difficulties with organization and study skills, or other learning disabilities. The school is ungraded, offering instruction from the early elementary school level through the eighth grade.

History
Margaret G. Shepherd founded Oakland in 1950 as a summer camp and remedial school called the Oakland Farm Camp & School and located on her family's farm. Shepherd offered a program that she had created, using phonics to teach reading and offering positive reinforcement to build students' self-esteem. In 1967 she expanded it to a year-round residential school program, and in 1968 the Virginia Board of Education certified the school as a private, non-profit learning disabilities school.

Shepherd taught at Oakland School up to the time of her death at age 91. In 1974 her daughter, Joanne Dondero, succeeded her as school director, continuing in that role until 1993.

Carol Williams, who joined the school staff in 1978, is the school's current head of school.

Program
Oakland enrolls up to 50 students during the school year, including boarding and day students, and offers a five-week summer school enrolling up to 120 students. Students are admitted to the school-year program between the ages of six and thirteen, and typically remain for two to four years.  To gain admission, students are expected to have average or above average intellectual abilities and should not have primary and severe emotional or behavioral disorders.

Each student has a daily one-on-one with a reading teacher, who directs the student's entire curriculum. A multi-sensory, vowel-based phonics program that is similar to the Orton-Gillingham approach is used to teach struggling readers that have not found success elsewhere.

Students leave Oakland when they are ready to participate successfully in mainstream schools, entering at grade levels between fifth and ninth grade.

Daily physical education participation is required. Horseback riding is available as a weekly activity and aids in emotional and social development while developing responsibility. Typically, about three-quarters (or more) of the students participate in riding. The school fields interscholastic basketball and soccer teams as well as several intramural sports.

Campus
Oakland occupies a  campus. The campus is dominated by the "Big House," which was built in the mid-18th century and expanded in the early 19th century when Oakland was a plantation. The Big House contains administrative offices and several classrooms. Other school buildings include the Old Kitchen, which was just a chimney when Shepherd first came to Oakland Farm in 1922, and the School House, which was built in 1963. Other facilities include a modern gymnasium and recreation center, an art room and music room, a dining hall and library, and modern classroom buildings and dormitories.

School colors and mascot
The school's colors are green and yellow and its mascot is the bulldog.

See also
Dyslexia support in the United States

References

External links
 Oakland School website

Private middle schools in Virginia
Private elementary schools in Virginia
Learning disabilities
Boarding schools in Virginia
Educational institutions established in 1950
Special schools in the United States
Schools in Albemarle County, Virginia
1950 establishments in Virginia
Private K–8 schools in the United States